Walczak is a Polish surname. Notable people with the surname include:

 Adam Walczak, Polish footballer
 Bill Walczak, candidate for Mayor of Boston
 Damian Walczak, Polish cyclist
 Diana Walczak, American sculptor
 Ed Walczak (1915-1998), American baseball player
 Józef Walczak (1931-2016), Polish football manager
 Krzysztof Walczak, Polish footballer
 Mark Walczak, American football player
 Patryk Walczak, Polish handball player
 Ruth Walczak, British rower
 Tomasz Walczak, Polish footballer
 Witold Walczak, American lawyer

Polish-language surnames
Patronymic surnames